Prakash Anand Schaffter (born 19 June 1967) is a Sri Lankan former first-class cricketer and cricket administrator, in addition to being a businessman.

The son of the cricketer and businessman Chandra Schaffter, he was born at Colombo in June 1967. His father pulled him and his brother, Dinesh, out of school a year early so that he could privately study for their GCSEs and A Levels, which enabled Schaffter to study in England at the University of London. From the University of London, he proceeded to study for his MBA at King's College, Cambridge. While studying at Cambridge, he played first-class cricket for Cambridge University Cricket Club in 1997 and 1998, making five appearances. Playing in the Cambridge side as a right-arm fast-medium bowler, Schaffter took three wickets at an average of 65.00. As a lower order batsman, he scored 20 runs with a highest score of 12. 

After working in the insurance industry in England, Schaffter returned to Sri Lanka where he worked for Janashakthi Insurance, which had been founded by his father in 1994. He later became chairman of the company. As a cricket administrator, Schaffter was secretary of Sri Lanka Cricket, in addition to serving as president and general secretary of the Tamil Union Cricket and Athletic Club.

References

External links

1967 births
Living people
Cricketers from Colombo
Alumni of the University of London
Alumni of King's College, Cambridge
Sri Lankan cricketers
Cambridge University cricketers
Sinhalese businesspeople
Businesspeople in insurance
Sri Lankan chief executives
Sri Lankan cricket administrators